Events in the year 2017 in Ghana.

Incumbents
President: John Dramani Mahama (until 7 January); Nana Akufo-Addo (from 7 January)
Vice President: Kwesi Amissah-Arthur (until 7 January); Mahamudu Bawumia (from 7 January)
 Chief Justice: Georgina Wood (until 8 June), Sophia Akuffo (starting 19 June)

Events

7 January – Nana Akufo-Addo took over as president.
May - Kwesi Nyantakyi appointed Confederation of African Football Vice President

Deaths
12 February – Sam Arday, footballer (b. 1945).

References

 
2010s in Ghana
Years of the 21st century in Ghana
Ghana
Ghana